is a Japanese professional sumo wrestler from Setouchi, Kagoshima. He debuted in sumo wrestling in July 2011 and made his makuuchi debut in July 2018.  His highest rank has been sekiwake. He wrestles for Tatsunami stable. Unusually for a top-class sumo wrestler, he uses his given name as his shikona.

Background
Meisei was born in Setouchi, a town on Amami Ōshima, one of the Ryukyu Islands. He began sumo at the age of five and was strongly encouraged by his father and other family members. When his elementary school closed their sumo programme he joined a sumo club in a neighboring town and in sixth grade he won the All-Japan Primary School Sumo Tournament. He moved to the Kamogawa Junior High School and competed in national championships but failed to win any further championships. Although he considered attending High School he took his father's advice and left education at the age of 15 to pursue a career in professional sumo.

Career

Early career
In 2011 Meisei joined the Tatsunami stable, bringing him under the tutelage of the former komusubi Asahiyutaka. Unlike most new wrestlers who begin their careers under their family names he took his given name as his shikona surname. Shortly before his sixteenth birthday he began his professional career in July 2011 and recorded four wins in seven bouts in the jonokuchi division to secure promotion to jonidan. A 5-2 result in November saw him promoted to the fourth sandanme division but in January 2012 he won only two matches and returned to jonidan after posting his first make-koshi (losing record). He returned to sandanme after a 6–1 record in March 2012 and a run of kachi-koshi (winning records) saw him promoted to makushita (third division) in January 2013. After moving up and down between sandanme and makushita several times he established himself in the higher division and began a steady climb through the ranks. In September 2016 a 4-3 result at the rank of makushita 3 saw him promoted to the second juryo division for the first time. He returned to makushita after recording a 5–10 record in November but was promoted back to juryo after two consecutive kachi-koshi. A series of solid results saw him rise to the top of the second division and in May 2018 a 10–5 record at juryo saw him promoted to the makuuchi division.

Makuuchi career

In his first tournament in the top division Meisei was assigned the rank of maegashira 16. His kesho-mawashi, which featured the sun rising from the sea was embroidered by Miyuki Tanaka whose previous clients had included Chiyonofuji. He recorded six wins including victories over Hokutofuji and Chiyomaru but was relegated back to juryo. Nine wins at juryo 2 saw him return to the top division in November 2018 when he posted a 9–6 record including wins over Chiyomaru and Ōnoshō. In January he reached a score of 6-7 after 13 days but reached his kachi-koshi by beating Yoshikaze and Onosho in his last two bouts. Competing a career high of maegashira 11 in March 2019 he won nine of his fourteen bouts highlighted by an uwatedashinage win over the former ōzeki Kotoshogiku on day 13. In the following tournament, at another career high rank of maegashira 7 he lost his first three bouts but won ten of his remaining twelve matches including a victory over Tochinoshin. He reached  maegashira 2 in November 2019.

On December 28 during training at his stable he injured his left upper arm muscle. He still entered the January 2020 tournament but withdrew on Day 8 with only one win. He failed to make kachi-koshi in March 2020 at the rank of maegashira 17, and secured his demotion to jūryō. In July 2020, he won the jūryō championship following a six-man playoff, ensuring his return to makuuchi. 

After several solid performances saw him rise to maegashira 3 by March 2021, he produced a 10–5 record to win his first Fighting Spirit prize. In July 2021 he made his sanyaku debut at the rank of komusubi. He was the first wrestler from Tatsunami stable to reach that rank since Tomonohana in 1994. The following tournament he was promoted to sekiwake, the first from Tatsunami since Kitao in 1985. He earned his first win over a yokozuna on Day 12 of the September tournament when he defeated Terunofuji, although as he was not ranked as a maegashira he did not get a kinboshi. He finished the November 2021 tournament with a 7-8 record. 

In the January 2022 banzuke he was demoted from sekiwake back to komusubi. In the New Year tournament he posted a 5-10 record. This lead to his demotion to the rank of maegashira 3 in the following rankings. At the March tournament he had a 1-14 record. He was then ranked maegashira 13 for the May tournament. He then posted winning records in each of the four remaining tournaments of 2022.

In the first banzuke of 2023 he was promoted back to the rank of komusubi. However, at the January 2023 tournament his kachi-koshi streak was ended on day 12 after a loss to Sadanoumi. He finished the tournament with a 5-10 record.

Fighting style
Meisei has shown a preference for yotsu techniques which involve grasping his opponent's mawashi or belt and favors the hidari-yotsu, or left-hand inside grip. His most common kimarite or winning move is yorikiri, the force-out.

Career record

See also
Glossary of sumo terms
List of active sumo wrestlers
List of sekiwake

References

1995 births
Living people
Japanese sumo wrestlers
Sumo people from Kagoshima Prefecture
Tatsunami stable sumo wrestlers
Sekiwake